Walang Hanggan (International title: Eternity / ) is a Philippine television drama romance series broadcast by GMA Network. Directed by Gina Alajar, it stars Valerie Concepcion and Oyo Boy Sotto. It premiered on November 10, 2003 replacing Hawak Ko ang Langit. The series concluded on February 27, 2004 with a total of 80 episodes. It was replaced by Ikaw sa Puso Ko in its timeslot.

Cast and characters

Lead cast
Valerie Concepcion as Almira
Oyo Boy Sotto as Basti

Supporting cast
Iya Villania as Rachelle
Andrew Schimmer as Emil
Miko Sotto as Mike
Zoren Legaspi
Sharmaine Arnaiz
Perla Bautista
Mikel Campos
Marissa Sanchez
Teri Onor

External links
 

2003 Philippine television series debuts
2004 Philippine television series endings
Filipino-language television shows
GMA Network drama series
Philippine romance television series
Television series by TAPE Inc.
Television shows set in the Philippines